Elena Gracinda Santos (born 6 February 1997) is a South African professional soccer player who plays as a forward for Turkish Women's Football Super League club Galatasaray SK. She also holds American citizenship.

Private life and early years
Elena Gracinda Santos was born in a Cape Verde-descent family to Mario Santos and Lisa Audet in Johannesburg, South Africa on 6 February 1997. She has two brothers Luis and Mario. She went to the United States, and received later United States citizenship.

In the United States, she went to Conard High School, where she played soccer and captained the school squad. Playing in the forward/midfielder position,  she was the top goalscorer and held the school record for goals. She was a top player in the division, and was also picked as one of the best players in the state. She was named to All-CCC West team. She received a four-star ranking from the academy soccer website TopDrawerSoccer.com, and 150 national ranking from the sports management company IMG.

After finishing the high school, she attended Fairfield University in 2015. She played two seasons for the college team Fairfield Stags, and scored six goals in 31 matches.

In 2017, Santos entered University of Connecticut (UConn) to major in Communication studies. There, she played in the college team  UConn Huskies. She netted five goals in 35 games played in 2017 and 2018. She played also at the post-season college football all-star game Senior Bowl of the New England Women's Intercollegiate Sailing Association (NEWISA) in 2018.

Club career 
Santos played for NJ/NY Gotham FC Reserves in the Women's Premier Soccer League of the United States. In March 2022, she moved to Turkey, and joined the newly established club Galatasaray S.K. in İtsanbul to play in the Women's Super League.

References

External links 

1997 births
Living people
Soccer players from Johannesburg
South African people of Cape Verdean descent
Sportspeople of Cape Verdean descent
South African women's soccer players
Women's association football forwards
Women's association football midfielders
South African expatriate  soccer players
South African emigrants to the United States
Naturalized citizens of the United States
People from West Hartford, Connecticut
Sportspeople from Hartford County, Connecticut
Soccer players from Connecticut
American people of Cape Verdean descent
American sportspeople of African descent
American people of South African descent
Sportspeople of South African descent
American women's soccer players
Fairfield University alumni
Fairfield Stags women's soccer players
University of Connecticut alumni
UConn Huskies women's soccer players
American expatriate women's soccer players
South African expatriate sportspeople in Turkey
Expatriate women's footballers in Turkey
Turkish Women's Football Super League players
Galatasaray S.K. women's football players
Women's Premier Soccer League players